Shafran is a surname which derived from eastern Yiddish shafran and originated from Arabic  (az-za'faran).

The root of the surname lies in the spice saffron. There are various forms of the name in Russia. Polish version is Szafran. The surname has also existed in various forms in Hebrew (שפרן), Old French, Hungarian, and Middle High German. The name is most common among Jewish and Russian families. It is known to be ornamental, used to describe someone with saffron-colored (yellow-red) hair, occupational, used to describe a merchant of the spice, and topographic, for someone who lived where saffron grew. Common forms of this name include "Safran", "Safranek", "Safranski", and "Szafran". Shafran may be cognate with the name "Safra".

People with the surname Shafran 

 Alexandru Șafran, rabbi
 Avi Shafran, rabbi
 Daniil Shafran, Soviet cellist
 Isaak Grigorevich Shafran, creator of Shafran's hexagonal chess
 Nigel Shafran, English photographer
 Peter Shafran, concert and festival producer/promoter
 Shimrit Shafran (Shim), Israeli musician (maiden name: Shimrit Ovadia)
 Robert Shafran, a triplet profiled in the 2018 documentary film, Three Identical Strangers
 Shafran Packeer

See also 

Ashkenazi Jews, those who speak Yiddish
Zəfəran, Azerbaijan

References 

Occupational surnames
Surnames